Veliki vojvoda (from veliki = great and vojvoda = duke) was a military and noble title in use during the Middle Ages and the Modern period in the Western Balkans. It is often translated into "grand duke".


Middle Ages
Veliki vojvoda was a title used in Serbia in the Middle Ages and the Kingdom of Bosnia.

Serbia
It signified superiority over the other vojvodas. The title-holder commanded the army on occasions when the monarch did not attend in military campaigns, usually with lesser important military operations inside the country, or when a detachment was sent to aid allies. Another term used for the title was "standard-bearer" (stegonoša).

Novak Grebostrek ( 1312), served Stefan Milutin
Hrelja ( 1320s–31), served Stefan Dečanski
Gradislav Borilović ( 1333), served Stefan Dušan
Jovan Oliver ( 1341–55), served Stefan Dušan
Nikola Stanjević ( 1355–66), served Stefan Dušan and/or Stefan Uroš V
Uglješa Mrnjavčević ( 1358), served Stefan Uroš V
Radoslav Mihaljević ( 1426–d. 1436), served Stefan Lazarević
Mihailo Anđelović ( 1456–58), served Lazar Branković

There are also mentions of the title-holders in Serbian epic poetry regarding the Battle of Kosovo, such as Dimitrije.

Bosnia

Modern period

Montenegro
The title was adopted in the Prince-Bishopric of Montenegro. Mirko Petrović-Njegoš bore the title, as "Grand Duke of Grahovo".

See also
velikaš (magnate)
veliki čelnik
veliki župan
veliki kaznac

References

Sources

Serbian noble titles
Military ranks

Serbian Empire
Serbian Despotate
Bosnian noble titles